(SHI) is an integrated manufacturer of industrial machinery, automatic weaponry, ships, bridges and steel structure, equipment for environmental protection, including recycling, power transmission equipment, plastic molding machines, laser processing systems, particle accelerators, material handling systems, cancer diagnostic and treatment equipment and others.

History
In 1888, a company was formed to provide equipment repair services to the Besshi copper mine.  Almost 50 years later, in 1934, the company incorporated as Sumitomo Machinery Co., Ltd. to manufacture machinery for the steel and transportation industries in support of that period of rapid economic growth.

In 1969, Sumitomo Machinery Co., Ltd. merged with Uraga Heavy Industries Co., Ltd. to create Sumitomo Heavy Industries, Ltd.  The company continues to innovate and expand to meet the demands of the new market frontiers. Today, Sumitomo Heavy Industries manufactures injection molding machines, laser systems, semiconductor machinery and liquid crystal production machinery.

In 1979, the company famously built the Seawise Giant, an Ultra Large Crude Carrier (ULCC) supertanker; the longest ship ever built.

As of 2021, it's reported that SHI has ceased making light machine guns for the JSDF due to bleak economic prospects.

Products

Sumitomo NTK-62 Machine gun
Seawise Giant, the largest ship ever built
Excavator, OEM Suppliers of Case and Link-belt
Paver
Gear reducers & Electric Motors

References

External links

Official Site

 
Companies listed on the Tokyo Stock Exchange
Construction equipment manufacturers of Japan
Companies listed on the Osaka Exchange
Manufacturing companies of Japan
Shipbuilding companies of Japan
Firearm manufacturers of Japan
Defense companies of Japan
Technology companies established in 1888
Sumitomo Group
Manufacturing companies established in 1888
Japanese companies established in 1888